Tanjazz is an international jazz festival held annually in Tangier, Morocco since the year 2000. The event typically has drawn a capacity crowd.

See also 
 Abdelhafid Palace

References

External links
 Official website

Jazz festivals in Morocco
Tourist attractions in Tangier
Recurring events established in 2000